Norman Forber Kay (5 January 1929 – 12 May 2001) was a British composer and writer.

Kay, who was born in Bolton, was educated at Bolton School, the Royal Manchester College of Music and the Royal College of Music. Kay composed the incidental music for three serials in the first season of Doctor Who, including the very first, An Unearthly Child, as well as The Keys of Marinus and The Sensorites.

After leaving Doctor Who following its first season, Kay provided the incidental music for many of the Out of the Unknown stories during the rest of the 1960s, as well as composing the atmospheric theme tune of its first three seasons. Kay also provided music on productions such as Late Night Horror in 1968, as well as many other television productions. He also scored the 1968 comedy heist film Diamonds for Breakfast. Kay also worked as a music critic for The Daily Telegraph. He was the first British musician to write a study on Dmitri Shostakovich, a work that was well received.

In 1969 Kay married Janice Willett, a former producer with ABC Television, and the couple had a daughter. Kay died in 2001 of motor neuron disease aged 72.

References

External links

1929 births
2001 deaths
Alumni of the Royal College of Music
Alumni of the Royal Northern College of Music
British composers
British television composers
Neurological disease deaths in the United Kingdom
Deaths from motor neuron disease
English music critics
People educated at Bolton School
People from Bolton